The Bigod family was a medieval Norman family, the second Earls of Norfolk, the first being Ralph de Guader.

Succession
Roger Bigod, 1st Earl of Norfolk, father of the true 1st Earl
Hugh Bigod, 1st Earl of Norfolk (1095–1177), second son, and heir, of Roger Bigod, founder of the English family of this name
Roger Bigod, 2nd Earl of Norfolk, son and heir of 1st earl
Hugh Bigod, 3rd Earl of Norfolk (1186–1225), son and heir of 2nd earl
Roger Bigod, 4th Earl of Norfolk, son of 3rd earl. No male issue, passes to nephew Roger
Roger Bigod, 5th Earl of Norfolk, son of Hugh Bigod (Justiciar), heir of 4th earl. No male issue; lands and titles revert to crown

Other
William Bigod, first son of Roger Bigod, 1st Earl of Norfolk, lost in the White Ship Disaster
William Hugh Bigod, other son of 2nd Earl
Hugh Bigod, second son of Hugh Bigod, 1st Earl of Norfolk (more specifically first son by second marriage)
Hugh Bigod (Justiciar) (?–1266), the youngest son of 3rd earl, father of 5th earl
Sir Francis Bigod
 Bigod's Rebellion

See also
Framlingham Castle
Bungay Castle
Orford Castle
The Anarchy
First Barons' War
Second Barons' War